Gerard van Deynen (fl. 1665 – after 1673), was a Dutch painter, who was enrolled in the Guild of Saint Luke of The Hague from 1665 to 1673.  He was possibly the father or brother of Isaac van Duynen, a still life painter.

Gerard van Deynen is sometimes confused with G. van Deynum (also sometimes referred to as Guilliam van Deynum), a still life painter who worked in Antwerp.

References

Painters from The Hague
Artists from The Hague
Dutch Golden Age painters
Year of birth uncertain